"Don't Fight It" is a song written and recorded by the Australian band The Panics. It was released in August 2007 as the lead single from the band's third studio album, Cruel Guards. In January 2008, the song was voted in at number 10 on the Triple J Hottest 100, 2007. Following this, the song entered and peaked at number 43 in the ARIA Charts in February 2008, becoming the band's first single in the ARIA top 100.

At the ARIA Music Awards of 2008, the song was nominated for ARIA Award for Breakthrough Release.

The song was used for the end scene of the Ugly Betty episode "Tornado Girl" in 2008 and in episodes of Underbelly. It also appears on the Underbelly soundtrack album.

Background and reception
During the writing of the album, Myles Wootton approached Laffer with a drum loop and trumpet sample that swiftly evolved into "Don't Fight It".

The song is in the key of A major and should be played at a tempo of 92 BPM.

In a positive album review by Andy Gill from The Independent he called the song "the best of all".

Track listing
7" single 
 "Don't Fight It"	
 "Get Us Home"

Charts

Release history

References

The Panics songs
2007 songs
2007 singles